The Presbyterian Church in Korea (BoSuHapDong) was founded in 1984. A group under the leadership of Pastor Kang Young-Suh separated from the BangBae group. It has 101,400 members and 408 parishes, and adheres to the Westminster Confession. The church has Presbyterian government with 17 Presbyteries and a General Assembly.

References 

Presbyterian denominations in South Korea
Christian organizations established in 1984
1984 establishments in South Korea